The New Land is a 1924 German silent historical film directed by Hans Behrendt and starring Otto Gebühr, Reinhold Schünzel, and Aud Egede-Nissen. It depicts the discovery of the Americas by Christopher Columbus. It premiered in Berlin on 12 August 1924.

Cast

References

Bibliography

External links

1924 films
Films of the Weimar Republic
German silent feature films
German historical drama films
1920s historical drama films
Films directed by Hans Behrendt
Films set in the 1490s
Films set in Spain
German black-and-white films
Age of Discovery films
Cultural depictions of Christopher Columbus
1924 drama films
Silent historical drama films
Silent adventure films
1920s German films
1920s German-language films